is the ninth single by Japanese recording artist Arisa Mizuki. It was released on May 24, 1995 as the second single from Mizuki's fourth studio album Cute. Both the title track and B-side, "Zutto Soba ni Ite," were written by Masanori Nagaoka, and composed by Yasuhiko Hoshino. "Dakishimete!" was used in commercials for Umi to Taiyō no Megumi de Arau Body Soap by Shiseido, starring Mizuki herself.

Chart performance 
"Dakishimete!" debuted on the Oricon Weekly Singles chart at number 20 with 52,150 copies sold in its first week. The single charted for six weeks and has sold a total of 96,140 copies.

Track listing

Charts and sales

References 

1995 singles
Alisa Mizuki songs
1995 songs
Nippon Columbia singles